Lupinus tamayoanus is a plant of the genus Lupinus in the legume family. Lupinus tamayoanus was described in 1942 from samples collected in Mérida, Venezuela.

References

Plants described in 1942
tamayoanus